Constanza María "Coty" Alonso (born 2 February 1986) is an Argentine politician who sits in the Argentine Chamber of Deputies for the Justicialist Party.

References 

Living people
1986 births
Justicialist Party politicians
21st-century Argentine women politicians
21st-century Argentine politicians
Members of the Argentine Chamber of Deputies elected in Buenos Aires Province
Women members of the Argentine Chamber of Deputies